Dan Brown's The Lost Symbol, or simply The Lost Symbol, is an American action-adventure mystery-thriller television series based on Dan Brown's 2009 novel The Lost Symbol. The series is a prequel to the Robert Langdon film series and features Ashley Zukerman as fictional Harvard symbologist Robert Langdon.  It also stars Eddie Izzard, Beau Knapp, Rick Gonzalez, Valorie Curry and Sumalee Montano in main roles. Dan Trachtenberg directed the series pilot and serves as executive producer on the series alongside Ron Howard, Brian Grazer and Brown himself. The series consists of ten episodes, premiered on September 16, 2021 on Peacock. In January 2022, the series was cancelled after one season.

Plot
Years before the events of The Da Vinci Code, a young Robert Langdon is hired by the CIA to solve a number of deadly puzzles when his mentor goes missing.

Cast

Main

 Ashley Zukerman as Robert Langdon, a Harvard professor of Symbology
 Eddie Izzard as Peter Solomon, Robert's academic mentor
 Valorie Curry as Katherine Solomon, Peter's daughter
 Beau Knapp as Mal'akh, a mysterious figure who sets Robert on a quest
 Rick Gonzalez as Alfonso Nuñez, a Capitol police officer
 Sumalee Montano as Inoue Sato, director of the CIA's office of security

Recurring

 Raoul Bhaneja as Nicholas Bastin, the "Janitor"
 Laura De Carteret as Isabel Solomon, Peter's wife
 Keenan Jolliff as Zachary Solomon, Peter's son
 Sammi Rotibi as Agent Adamu, a Nigerian-born CIA operative
 Tyrone Benskin as Warren Bellamy, the architect of the Capitol
 Greg Bryk as Ellison Blake, a CIA officer
 Steve Cumyn as Jonathan Knopp
 Mark Gibbon as Samyaza

Episodes

Production

Development
Originally developed as a film to have starred Tom Hanks as Robert Langdon and to be produced and directed by Ron Howard for Columbia Pictures along with the franchise's producers Brian Grazer and John Calley. Between 2010 and 2013 Sony Pictures eventually hired three screenwriters for the project, Steven Knight, Dan Brown himself, and Danny Strong. In July 2013, Sony Pictures announced they would instead adapt Inferno for an October 14, 2016, release.

In June 2019, the project was announced to be re-conceived as a television series tentatively titled Langdon. The series serves as a prequel to the film series, with Dan Dworkin and Jay Beattie serving as co-creators, showrunners and executive producers. Brown, Ron Howard, Brian Grazer, Samie Kim Falvey and Anna Culp will act as additional executive producers. The show will be a co-production between Imagine Television Studios, CBS Studios, and Universal Television Studios and was ordered to series on NBC. In March 2021, it was announced the series was picked up to series by Peacock. The new title of the series, Dan Brown's The Lost Symbol, was revealed on May 17, 2021, with a trailer for the series. The first episode was directed by Dan Trachtenberg, who also is an executive producer on the series.

On January 24, 2022, Peacock canceled the series after one season.

Casting
In March 2020 it was announced that Ashley Zukerman had been cast to portray Robert Langdon. In June 2020 it was announced that Valorie Curry and Eddie Izzard had been cast as Katherine and Peter Solomon. A few days later additional cast members were announced, Sumalee Montano as Sato, Rick Gonzalez as Nunez and Beau Knapp as Mal'akh. In June 2021, Raoul Bhaneja, Sammi Rotibi, and Keenan Jolliff were cast in recurring roles.

Filming
Principal photography for the first season of the series began on June 14, 2021, in Toronto, Ontario and concluded on October 20, 2021.

Release
The series premiered on September 16, 2021, on Peacock. A collection of six posters, each featuring one of the main cast of the show, was released the day before the premiere. In India, the series was picked by Voot for streaming. In Hong Kong, TVB has carried the series for myTV Super, premiered simultaneously within the US broadcast.

NBC also scheduled to broadcast the pilot episode on its network on November 8, making it the first Peacock original to get aired network release as well.

Reception
The review aggregator website Rotten Tomatoes reported a 50% approval rating with an average rating of 6.5/10, based on 12 critic reviews. The website's critics consensus reads, "With a promising premise, handsome locations, and a well-known character, The Lost Symbol has all the pieces necessary to be an addictive addition to Robert Langdon's story—if only the show's flat writing and strange pace didn't undermine all that potential." Metacritic gave the series a weighted average score of 53 out of 100 based on 5 critic reviews, indicating "mixed or average reviews".

References

External links
 
Official Dan Brown website
"Official" Robert Langdon website

The Lost Symbol
2020s American drama television series
2020s American mystery television series
2021 American television series debuts
2021 American television series endings
American action adventure television series
American prequel television series
English-language television shows
Peacock (streaming service) original programming
Serial drama television series
Treasure hunt television series
Television shows based on American novels
Television series by CBS Studios
Television series by Universal Television
Television series by Imagine Entertainment
Television shows filmed in Toronto